Willian Marlon Ferreira Moraes (born 14 December 1995), known as Willian Maranhão, is a Brazilian footballer who plays as a defensive midfielder for Ceará, on loan from Santos.

Club career

Boavista
Born in São Luís, Maranhão, Willian Maranhão was a Boavista youth graduate. He made his first team debut on 21 January 2014, coming on as a second-half substitute for Thiaguinho in a 1–0 Campeonato Carioca home win over Madureira.

Willian Maranhão subsequently became a regular starter for the side, and scored his first senior goal on 13 September 2017, netting his team's third in a 3–1 home success against Tigres do Brasil, for the year's Copa Rio.

In June 2018, Willian Maranhão was loaned to Série C side Santa Cruz until the end of the tournament. He was a regular starter during his period at the club before terminating his loan deal on 30 August.

Vasco da Gama
On 5 September 2018, Willian Maranhão was presented at Série A side Vasco da Gama, on loan until the end of the year. He made his top tier debut five days later, starting in a 0–1 away loss against Vitória.

On 4 December 2018, Willian Maranhão signed a permanent deal with Vasco until the end of 2022. However, he lost his starting spot in the 2019 campaign, and moved out on loan to América Mineiro until the end of the season in May of that year.

Upon returning from loan, Willian Maranhão failed to appear for the club until rescinding his contract in July 2020.

Atlético Goianiense
Shortly after leaving Vasco, Willian Maranhão signed a permanent deal with Atlético Goianiense. He immediately became a regular starter, but still left the club on 13 December 2021.

Bahia
On 9 January 2022, Willian Maranhão signed a two-year contract with Bahia, freshly relegated to the second division. He arrived with a first-choice status, but lost his starting spot to fellow new signing Rezende.

Santos
On 25 March 2022, Bahia announced the transfer of Willian Maranhão to Santos, who paid a R$ 500,000 fee for 70% of the player's economic rights. Just hours later, his new club confirmed the deal, with the player signing a contract until December 2024.

Willian Maranhão made his debut for Peixe on 5 April 2022, starting in a 0–1 Copa Sudamericana away loss against Banfield. On 16 July, after just nine matches, he returned to Atlético Goianiense on loan until the end of the year.

On 10 February 2023, Willian Maranhão joined Ceará on loan for the 2023 season.

Career statistics

Honours
Boavista
 Copa Rio: 2017

Atlético Goianiense
 Campeonato Goiano: 2020

References

External links

1995 births
Living people
Brazilian footballers
People from São Luís, Maranhão
Sportspeople from Maranhão
Association football midfielders
Campeonato Brasileiro Série A players
Campeonato Brasileiro Série B players
Campeonato Brasileiro Série C players
Campeonato Brasileiro Série D players
Boavista Sport Club players
Santa Cruz Futebol Clube players
CR Vasco da Gama players
América Futebol Clube (MG) players
Atlético Clube Goianiense players
Esporte Clube Bahia players
Santos FC players
Ceará Sporting Club players